Gamemaker or Game Maker may refer to:
 Video game developer
 GameMaker, a game creation system originally created in 1999 by Mark Overmars, developed by YoYo Games
 Game Makers, a 2002-2005 TV show on G4 television
 Game-Maker, a 1991 DOS-based suite of game design tools by Recreational Software Designs
 Garry Kitchen's GameMaker, a 1985 development environment for the Commodore 64, Apple II, and IBM PCs
 The 3D Gamemaker, a 2001 game creation system by The Game Creators

See also 
 Game creation system
 Video game programming